Scenario is an album by jazz guitarist Al Di Meola that was released in 1983. Musicians include keyboardist Jan Hammer, bassist Tony Levin and drummers Bill Bruford and Phil Collins.

Track listing 
 "Mata Hari" (Al Di Meola) – 6.04
 "African Night" (Di Meola, Jan Hammer) – 4.51
 "Island Dreamer" (Hammer) – 4.06
 "Scenario" (Di Meola) – 3.56
 "Sequencer" (Hammer) – 4.06
 "Cachaca" (Di Meola) – 5.34
 "Hypnotic Conviction" (Di Meola, Hammer) – 3.51
 "Calliope" (Di Meola) – 4.19
 "Scoundrel" (Di Meola, Hammer) – 3.44

Jan Hammer would re-use the drum sample that figures prominently in "Sequencer" in his better-known theme for the TV series Miami Vice, which first aired two years after the release of this album.

Personnel 
 Al Di Meola – guitars
 Jan Hammer – keyboards, Fairlight CMI programming
 Tony Levin – stick bass
 Bill Bruford – Simmons electronic drums
 Phil Collins – drums

Chart performance

References

External links
Reviews, Scenario
Sequencer music video

Al Di Meola albums
1983 albums
Columbia Records albums